Heinrich Joseph Maximilian Johann Maria von Brentano di Tremezzo (20 June 1904 – 14 November 1964), known professionally as Heinrich von Brentano, was a German politician  of the Christian Democratic Union (CDU). He served as Federal Minister for Foreign Affairs from 1955 to 1961.

Personal life
Brentano was born in Offenbach am Main, the son of the Centre politician Otto von Brentano, a member of the 1919 Weimar National Assembly. The Brentano family, of Italian (Lombard) origin, had settled in the Landgraviate of Hesse-Darmstadt in the 17th century and were recognized as Hessian nobles, with close contact to important figures of the German Romanticism, including Goethe, Savigny and Arnim. He was related to famous German poets such as Clemens Brentano (1778–1842)  and Bettina von Arnim (1785–1859). The author Bernard von Brentano (1901–1964) was his elder brother.

Upon his Abitur degree in 1922, Heinrich von Brentano studied jurisprudence at the University of Munich and took his first and second Staatsexamen in 1925 and 1929. He received his doctorate from the University of Giessen and from 1932 worked as a lawyer in Darmstadt, from 1943 until 1945 as a prosecutor in Hanau.

Brentano remained a bachelor throughout his life, living with his mother up to her death in 1948. In 1961, rumors circulated about his homosexuality, to which Adenauer drily replied: "He has not hit on me yet."

Brentano died of cancer at the age of 60. He was buried at Waldfriedhof Darmstadt.

Political career

After World War II, Brentano was one of the founders of the Christian Democratic Union in Hesse and became a member of the Landtag of Hesse in 1946, from 1947 as chairman of the parliamentary group.

He also attended the proceedings of the Parlamentarischer Rat assembly drafting the Basic Law for the Federal Republic of Germany. In the federal elections of 1949, he obtained a seat in the West German Bundestag parliament by directly winning the mandate of the Bergstraße constituency. In 1952 he and other CDU MPs advocated the implementation of a plurality voting system instead of the personalized proportional representation concept, though to no avail. In the federal parliament, he served as head of the CDU/CSU faction from 1949 to 1955 and again from 1961 until his death.

A member of the European Movement Germany, the European Common Assembly and the Parliamentary Assembly of the Council of Europe, Brentano was an important figure in the foundation of the European Economic Community (EEC).

After the Allied occupation statute had been lifted in 1955, he was appointed Foreign Minister of Germany at the suggestion of Chancellor Konrad Adenauer, who prior had filled the office himself. Brentano resigned when Adenauer had to form a coalition government with the Free Democratic Party (FDP) after the federal election of 1961 and had to accept the appointment of a FDP state secretary in the Foreign Office. He was succeeded by his party fellow Gerhard Schröder.

Honours

Foreign honours 
 Grand Cross of the Order of Christ, Portugal (10 April 1958)

References

1904 births
1964 deaths
People from Offenbach am Main
People from the Grand Duchy of Hesse
Federal government ministers of Germany
Foreign Ministers of Germany
Members of the Bundestag for Hesse
Members of the Bundestag 1961–1965
Members of the Bundestag 1957–1961
Members of the Bundestag 1953–1957
Members of the Bundestag 1949–1953
Arnim family
Grand Crosses 1st class of the Order of Merit of the Federal Republic of Germany
German people of Italian descent
Members of the Bundestag for the Christian Democratic Union of Germany
Members of Parlamentarischer Rat